Events in the year 2017 in Uruguay.

Incumbents
 President: Tabaré Vázquez
 Vice President: Raúl Fernando Sendic (until September 13), Lucía Topolansky (starting September 13)

Events

Deaths

5 January – Jorge Sanguinetti, politician (b. 1934).

24 September – Washington Benavides, poet and musician (b. 1930).

8 October – Coriún Aharonián, electroacoustic music composer and musicologist (b. 1940).

30 October – Daniel Viglietti, folk singer, guitarist, composer and political activist (b. 1939).

20 November – Amir Hamed, writer and translator (b. 1962).

21 November – Luis Garisto, footballer (b. 1945).

References

 
2010s in Uruguay
Years of the 21st century in Uruguay
Uruguay
Uruguay